Estefanía Craciún (born 1 January 1987) is a former tennis player from Uruguay.

Craciún won nine singles and ten doubles titles on the ITF Circuit. On 25 June 2007, she reached her best singles ranking of world No. 246. On 25 February 2008, she peaked at No. 226 in the doubles rankings.

Playing for Uruguay in Fed Cup competition, she has a win–loss record of 10–14.

Craciún retired in 2008, marrying footballer Walter Alberto López a year later.

ITF finals

Singles: 22 (9–13)

Doubles: 18 (10–8)

References

External links
 
 
 

1987 births
Living people
Sportspeople from Montevideo
Uruguayan female tennis players
Tennis players at the 2007 Pan American Games
Pan American Games competitors for Uruguay
20th-century Uruguayan women
21st-century Uruguayan women
Association footballers' wives and girlfriends